Tulcoides tibialis is a species of beetle in the family Cerambycidae. It was described by Martins and Galileo in 2009.

References

Onciderini
Beetles described in 2009